Michael Thaddeus (born January 12, 1967) is an American mathematician and a professor of mathematics at Columbia University. He is best known for having been a whistleblower in exposing deliberately misleading data submitted by Columbia University to U.S. News & World Report (USNWR)'s Best Colleges Ranking which exaggerated the university's college ranking. 

Thaddeus' exposé, An Investigation of the Facts Behind Columbia’s U.S. News Ranking, was published in February 2022, identifying discrepancies such as shrunken class sizes and the exaggeration of faculty credentials. Largely due to Thaddeus' analysis, Columbia later dropped from having been ranked 2nd to being ranked 18th, sparking speculation about the integrity of college rankings.

Early life and education 
Thaddeus was born on January 12, 1967, in New York City. He matriculated at Harvard College, graduating in 1988, and attained a Rhodes Scholarship to study at Corpus Christi College, Oxford. He later enrolled in St John's College, Oxford, where he earned his Doctor of Philosophy. His dissertation, Algebraic Geometry and the Verlinde Formula, was published in 1992 under the supervision of Simon Donaldson.

Academic career 
In 1998, Thaddeus joined the mathematics faculty of Columbia University. He has lectured at multiple institutions including Hunter College, Virginia Tech, and Creighton University, among others.

References 

1967 births
Living people
Harvard College alumni
Alumni of the University of Oxford
Columbia University faculty